Flash Gordon is a science fiction television series based on the King Features characters of the Alex Raymond-created comic strip of the same name. The black and white television series was a West German, French and American international co-production by Intercontinental Television Films and Telediffusion.

Plot
Diverging from the storyline of the comics, the series set Flash, Dale Arden and Dr. Zarkov in the year 3203. As agents of the Galactic Bureau of Investigation, the team travels the galaxy in their starship the Sky Flash, battling cosmic villains under the order of Commander Paul Richards.

The series proved popular with American audiences and critical response, though sparse, was positive. Flash Gordon has garnered little modern critical attention. What little there is generally dismisses the series, although there has been some critical thought devoted to its presentation of Cold War and capitalist themes.

Cast
 Steve Holland as Flash Gordon
 Irene Champlin as Dale Arden
 Joseph Nash as Hans Zarkov

Production

Development
Universal Studios had held the production rights to Flash Gordon but allowed them to lapse. Former Universal executives Edward Gruskin and Matty Fox struck a deal with Flash Gordon owners King Features Syndicate to produce the first 26 episodes of the series. The series was produced by Gruskin and Wenzel Lüdecke. Writers for Flash Gordon included Gruskin, Bruce Geller and Earl Markham. Episodes were directed by Wallace Worsley, Jr. and Gunther von Fritsch. Composers Kurt Heuser and Roger Roger provided much of the original music.

Filming
Shooting began in May 1953, with an abandoned beer hall in Spandau serving as the principal shooting location. Among the cast and crew, only the lead actors and director Worsley spoke English. Worsley would recall the production difficulties this caused: "No matter what galaxy we explored, everyone spoke with a German accent. The use of German actors who could not speak English required us to use a lot of close-ups. I would stand behind the camera, correctly positioned for the actor's look, and read his or her line; the actor would then repeat the line, mimicking my pronunciation and emphasis".

The series was budgeted at USD $15,000 per episode on a three-day-per-episode shooting schedule. Citing salary disputes, Worsley withdrew from the project after completing the first 26 episodes. Production was moved to Marseille under the direction of Gunther von Fritsch for the 13 final episodes. At that time, producer Luedecke was replaced by American producer Edward Gruskin.

Locations
The series was filmed in West Berlin and Marseille as a West German, French and American co-production by Intercontinental Television Films and Telediffusion.

Broadcast
The series aired in syndication throughout most of the U.S. but also aired on the East Coast on the DuMont Television Network.

Episodes

Critical response and themes
Variety noted that the series was from a technical standpoint "up to the demands of the script and the average viewer probably won't notice the differences in quality between this and home-grown produce". Flash Gordon was immediately popular in the United States and continued to run in syndication into the early 1960s.

Modern critical reaction to the series has been light but largely negative. The production values are frequently derided, with the series described as "bargain-basement". The televised series suffered in comparison to the earlier film serials with the television incarnation labeled "vastly inferior", lacking "good concepts and scripts" and "most of all, [lacking] Buster Crabbe, who was Flash Gordon". One positive comment notes Champlin's portrayal of Dale Arden, who was transformed from the typical damsel in distress of the serials into a trained scientist and a "quick thinker who often saved [Flash and Zarkov] from perishing".

Film theorist Wheeler Winston Dixon, far from decrying the series for its production values, finds that "the copious [use of] stock footage and the numerous exterior sequences shot in the ruins of the bombed-out metropolis give Flash Gordon a distinctly ravaged look". He writes that its international origins give the series "an interesting new cultural dimension, even a perceptible air of a split cultural identity".  Dixon quotes German cultural historian Mark Baker, who writes of a particular scene from the episode The Brain Machine as emblematic of this cultural split. The scene uses stock footage of a June 17, 1953 demonstration by East Berlin workers against the East German government. Soviet tanks opened fire on both demonstrators and bystanders, thus confirming East Germany's status as a Soviet puppet state in the minds of West Germans. American viewers, Baker speculates, were probably unaware of the iconic power in West Germany of the images of fleeing East Berlinners, which were used to illustrate a panic on Neptune.

Dixon, noting the similarities between the ideals espoused by "space operas" like Flash Gordon, Captain Video and Rocky Jones, Space Ranger and American Cold War values, argues that such series were designed to instill those values into their young viewers. Flash Gordon, he writes, along with its fellow space operas, "have a common, unifying theme: peace in the universe can be achieved only by dangerous efforts and the unilateral dominance of the Western powers". This echoes the earlier critique of Soviet writer G. Avarin, who in the Soviet film journal Art of the Cinema had accused Gordon and other space-faring characters of being "the vanguard of a new and greater 'American imperialism'". The "ravaged look" of the series, Dixon writes, "underscores the real-world stage on which the action of the space operas played".

Preservation status
Physical copies of two episodes, "Escape into Time" (October 8, 1954) and "The Witch of Neptune" (March 4, 1955), are held in the J. Fred MacDonald collection at the Library of Congress. A total of twenty-four episodes are currently available in the public domain, either on various DVD releases or on websites such as the Internet Archive and YouTube: Episodes 1, 5, 6, 8, 9, 10, 15, 16, 17, 18, 19, 20, 21, 22, 23, 24, 25, 26, 29, 34, 35, 36, 38 and 39. Video resolution varies based on the quality of source material.

See also
List of programs broadcast by the DuMont Television Network
List of surviving DuMont Television Network broadcasts

Notes

References

Bibliography
 Bassoir, Jean-Noel (2004). Space Patrol: Missions of Daring in the Name of Early Television. McFarland & Company. .
 Cook, John R. and Peter Wright (2006). British Science Fiction Television: A Hitchhiker's Guide. I.B. Tauris. .
 Harmon, Jim and Donald Frank Glut (1973). The Great Movie Serials: Their Sound and Fury. Routledge. .
 Dixon, Wheeler Winston. "Tomorrowland TV: The Space Opera and Early Science Fiction Television". collected in Telotte, J.P. (ed.) (2008). The Essential Science Fiction Television Reader, pp. 96–110. University Press of Kentucky. , .
 Terrace, Vincent (2002). Crime Fighting Heroes of Television: Over 10,000 Facts from 151 Shows, 1949-2001. McFarland & Company. .
 Worsley, Jr., Wallace and Sue Dwiggens Worsley (1997). From Oz to E.T.: Wally Worsley's Half Century in Hollywood. Lanham, MD, Scarecrow.

External links

DuMont historical website

1950s American science fiction television series
1954 American television series debuts
1955 American television series endings
American adventure television series
Black-and-white American television shows
DuMont Television Network original programming
First-run syndicated television programs in the United States
Flash Gordon television series
Space adventure television series
Television series set in the 4th millennium
Television shows filmed in Germany
Television shows filmed in France